Vila Isabel is a middle-class neighborhood in the North Zone of Rio de Janeiro, Brazil, known for its music-themed Boulevard 28 de Setembro, which celebrates the neighborhood's long musical heritage. Many musicians like Almirante, Braguinha, Henrique Brito and Noel Rosa (who has a statue of him seated at a cafe table on the aforementioned boulevard) used to play in Vila Isabel. It is home to Unidos de Vila Isabel, one of the most traditional samba schools in Rio de Janeiro.

The neighborhood was named in honor of Brazilian Princess Isabel, renowned for abolishing Brazil slavery.

References

Neighbourhoods in Rio de Janeiro (city)